City Square Park is a park in Boston's Charlestown neighborhood, in the U.S. state of Massachusetts.

The park has a World War II Memorial.

References

External links

Charlestown, Boston
Parks in Boston